Deolinda da Conceição (1914–1957) was the first woman writer and journalist in Macau. She was a Macanese (or Portuguese-descent), with Portuguese nationality.

References 

1914 births
1957 deaths
Conceicao
Macau writers
20th-century Macau people